Southern States may refer to:

The independent states of the Southern hemisphere

United States
 Southern United States, or the American South
 Southern States Cooperative, an American farmer-owned agricultural supply cooperative
 Southern States Athletic Conference, a collegiate athletic league
 The independent states of the South in the North-South divide

See also